Kika is a rural locality (a settlement) in Pribaykalsky District, Republic of Buryatia, Russia. The population was 508 as of 2010. There are 10 streets.

Geography 
Kika is located 48 km northeast of Turuntayevo (the district's administrative centre) by road. Turulevo is the nearest rural locality.

References 

Rural localities in Okinsky District